Walter Albert Jessup (August 12, 1877 – July 5, 1944) was an American academic administrator. He served as the eleventh President of the University of Iowa from 1916 to 1934.

Early life
Jessup was born on August 12, 1877, in Richmond, Indiana. He graduated from Earlham College, Hanover College and Columbia University. He was the 28th initiate of the Iowa Gamma chapter of Sigma Phi Epsilon fraternity.

Career
Jessup was the school superintendent in Westfield, Indiana and Madison, Indiana. Jessup served as the dean of the Indiana University School of Education, and as the eleventh President of the University of Iowa from 1916 to 1934.

Jessup was the president of the Carnegie Corporation of New York and the Carnegie Foundation for the Advancement of Teaching.

Death and legacy
Jessup resided in New York City. He summered in Arlington, Vermont.

Jessup died on July 5, 1944, in New York City, at 66. Jessup Hall on the university campus is named for him.

References

1877 births
1944 deaths
People from Richmond, Indiana
People from New York City
Earlham College alumni
Hanover College alumni
Columbia University alumni
Presidents of the University of Iowa